Tony Brooks (born August 3, 1950) is an American rower. He competed in the men's coxless four event at the 1976 Summer Olympics.  He graduated from Harvard University and Harvard Business School. He is currently the coach of the St. Ignatius Women’s Crew.

References

External links
 

1950 births
Living people
American male rowers
Olympic rowers of the United States
Rowers at the 1976 Summer Olympics
Sportspeople from Indianapolis
Harvard Crimson rowers
Pan American Games medalists in rowing
Pan American Games bronze medalists for the United States
Rowers at the 1975 Pan American Games
Harvard Business School alumni
20th-century American people